Croxall may refer to:

 Croxall (surname)
 Croxall, Derbyshire and Staffordshire, England, UK; a parish
 Croxall Hall, a manor house
 Croxall railway station
 Croxall Lakes, Staffordshire, England, UK; a nature reserve

See also